Amager Bakke (Amager Hill), also known as Amager Slope or Copenhill, is a combined heat and power waste-to-energy plant (new resource handling centre) and recreational facility in Amager, Copenhagen Denmark, located prominently within view of the city's downtown.

The facility opened in 2017, and partially replaced the nearby old incineration plant in Amager, which is in the process of being converted from coal to biomass (expected finished 2020). The two plants play a major role in Copenhagen's ambitions of meeting zero carbon requirements by 2025.

The recreational components of the facility (the dry ski run, hiking trail and climbing wall) opened in December 2018,  with an attendance estimated at 42-57 thousand visitors annually. 

Copenhill was named the ' World Building of the Year 2021 at the fourteenth annual World Architecture Festival.

Construction and technicalities

The plant opened on 30 March 2017. It is estimated to cost $670 million, and is expected to burn 400,000 tons of municipal solid waste annually. The climbing wall, manufactured by Walltopia, is the world's tallest climbing wall at 85 meters. 

Technically, the plant is designed to change between operating modes, producing 0-63 MW electricity and 157-247 MW district heating, depending on the local heat demand and power price. It produces more clean water than it uses. Because of filtration and other technologies, sulphur emission is expected to be reduced by 99.5% and NOx by about 95% as well as dioxins and HCl and it is claimed to be the cleanest incineration plant in the world.

An experiment intended the chimney to not emit its exhaust continuously, but instead in the form of "smoke" rings (consisting of water vapour rather than actual smoke).

Operational history 
On 7 September 2018 all waste treatment and energy production was stopped for 17 days to fix a design flaw in the compensators of the low pressure steam system.

References

External links 

 
 Technical brochure
 Video of 3 years of construction
 Video1 Video2
 Photo gallery

Waste power stations in Denmark